Antonio Romero may refer to:

 Antonio Romero (canoeist) (born 1968), Mexican sprint canoer
 Antonio Romero (footballer, born 1997), Venezuelan footballer
 Antonio Romero (footballer, born 1995), Spanish footballer
 E. Antonio Romero (1925–2005), Guatemalan philosopher, historian and writer